Hanni Fink (later Hanni Finková) was a luger from Czechoslovakia who competed during the 1930s. She won four medals in the women's singles event (all for Czechoslovakia) at the European luge championships with two golds under (1934, 1935) and two bronzes (1938, 1939). She was born in Smržovka.

References
 List of European luge champions 

Year of birth missing
Year of death missing
People from Smržovka
People from the Kingdom of Bohemia
German Bohemian people
Czechoslovak female lugers
Sudeten German people
Sportspeople from the Liberec Region